The Australian Design Rules (ADRs) are Australia's national technical regulations for vehicle safety, theft resistance, and emissions. They are largely based on and actively harmonised with the UN vehicle and equipment regulations, though some of the technical prescriptions of the US National Highway Traffic Safety Administration regulations are accepted despite differing from the ECE prescriptions.

The ADRs use only the technical requirements of the ECE Regulations; the ECE system of type approval is not used. Instead, the ADRs are administered according to a self-certification system like that of the United States: manufacturers do not seek government-sanctioned testing or homologation; rather, they certify that their vehicles and regulated vehicle components comply with all applicable provisions of all applicable ADRs in effect on the date of manufacture. On vehicles, this certification is made by dint of the manufacturer affixing a "compliance plate" stating the vehicle's specifications and parameters, build date, identification number, and other required information along with a statement to the effect that the vehicle complies with all applicable ADRs.

Vehicles configured in accordance with the regulations of countries other than Australia are generally barred from import to Australia unless they are brought into compliance with applicable ADRs and the conversion work is inspected and certified by an authorised compliance engineer.

According to Business Spectator climate reporter Tristan Edis, as of early 2014 Australia's emissions standards as specified in the ADRs lagged behind those of most developed countries, and Australia was one of only a few major economies without fuel economy standards applying to cars.

References 

Manufacturing in Australia
Road transport in Australia
Vehicle law